Al Bi’ār is a village in Makkah Province, in western Saudi Arabia.

See also 

 List of cities and towns in Saudi Arabia
 Regions of Saudi Arabia

References

Populated places in Mecca Province